The year 1558 in science and technology included a number of events, some of which are listed here.

Economics
 November – Thomas Gresham states Gresham's law.

Exploration
 English explorer Anthony Jenkinson travels from Moscow to Astrakhan and Bokhara. He is the first Englishman to note that the Amu Darya changed course to start flowing into the Aral Sea.

Music

Publications
 Giambattista della Porta publishes the popular science book Magia Naturalis in Naples.
 First publication of Petrus Peregrinus de Maricourt's 13th century Epistola de magnete, edited by Achilles Gasser and printed in Augsburg.

Awards
 September 4 – John Feild receives a confirmation of arms in England and the grant of a crest allusive to his attainments in astronomy.

Births
 Robert Alaine, English astronomer (died 1603)
 André du Laurens, French physician and gerontologist (died 1609)
 Olivier van Noort, Dutch circumnavigator (died 1627)

Deaths
 March 6 – Luca Gaurico, Italian astrologer (born 1476)
 March 6 – Fray Marcos de Niza, Savoyard Franciscan explorer (born c. 1495)
 October 21 – Julius Caesar Scaliger, Italian-born polymath (born 1484)
 Jean Fernel, French physician (born 1497)
 Robert Recorde, Welsh-born physician and mathematician (born c. 1512)
 approx. date
 Álvar Núñez Cabeza de Vaca, Spanish anthropologist (born c.  1488/90)

References

 
16th century in science
1550s in science